Karel van der Toorn (born 8 March 1956 in The Hague) is a Dutch scholar of ancient religions. From 2006 to 2011 he was chairman of the Board at the University of Amsterdam, where he  was a professor since 1998 and until he became the chairman of the Board.

Van der Toorn previously taught at Utrecht University and Leiden University. In 2012 he was made a Commander of the French National Order of Merit.

Works
Dictionary of Deities and Demons in the Bible; co-editor. 1995, 1999.
Scribal Culture and the Making of the Hebrew Bible.  Cambridge, Mass., 2007, Harvard University Press

References

1956 births
Living people
Dutch biblical scholars
Academic staff of the University of Amsterdam
Commanders of the Ordre national du Mérite
Academic staff of Utrecht University
Academic staff of Leiden University
Writers from The Hague
Vrije Universiteit Amsterdam alumni